The Cayman Islands women's national under-16 and under-17 basketball team is a national basketball team of the Cayman Islands, administered by the Cayman Islands Basketball Association.
It represents the country in international under-16 and under-17 (under age 16 and under age 17) women' basketball competitions.

See also
Cayman Islands men's national basketball team

References

External links
Archived records of Cayman Islands team participations

Basketball teams in the Cayman Islands
Women's national under-17 basketball teams
Basketball